Hasle Church is a church in the neighborhood of Hasle in the city of Oslo, Norway.

The church was designed by architect Harald Hille and was consecrated by bishop Johannes Smemo on December 11, 1960. It is a yellow brick church. There is a separate bell tower. Church orientation is from northeast to southwest. The church room itself can seat about 270 people, and there is an adjoining church hall. In addition, the built-in kitchen, church room, meeting room, offices and two rooms as well as shelters. There is a small sacristy near the organ. The church organ has 14 voices and was put into service a month after the church was consecrated.

The altar tapestry is created by Kari-Bjørg Ile.  On the west wall of the ward hall also hangs a former altarpiece from a former church building in central Oslo. The church underwent rehabilitation work in 2019.

The church is listed by the Norwegian Directorate for Cultural Heritage.

References

External links 

Official parish website in Norwegian

Lutheran churches in Oslo
Churches completed in 1960
1960 establishments in Norway
20th-century Church of Norway church buildings